Ingeborg Birgersdotter ( - 30 June 1302), was a Duchess consort of Saxony, married to John I, Duke of Saxony. She was the daughter of the Swedish regent Birger Jarl and Princess Ingeborg Eriksdotter of Sweden.

Marriage and issue 
Ingeborg married John I, Duke of Saxony, in 1270.  She had eight children, among them the following:
 Helen (*c. 1272–1337*), married with (1) Günther IX, Count of Schwarzburg-Blankenburg (*died 1289*), (2) in c. 1297 Adolph VI, Count of Holstein-Schauenburg
 Elisabeth (*c. 1274– before 1306*), married in 1287 with Valdemar IV, Duke of Schleswig.
 John II (*c. 1275–22 April 1321*)
 Eric I (*1280/1282–1359/1361*)
 Albert III (*c. 1281–October 1308*)
 Sophia (*died 13 December 1319*), prioress in Plötzkau

References
Cronica Principum Saxonie, MGH SS XXV, sida 476
Annales Lubicenses 1302, MGH SS XVI, sida 418

Duchesses of Saxe-Lauenburg
1302 deaths
1253 births
House of Ascania
House of Bjelbo
Swedish emigrants to Germany